American Video Entertainment, Inc. was an American video game company based in San Jose, California. The company developed unlicensed video games for the Nintendo Entertainment System. The company developed two games on its own, Dudes with Attitude and Trolls on Treasure Island, and published 19 games altogether for the NES.

Antitrust lawsuit 
In January 1991, American Video Entertainment filed an antitrust lawsuit against Nintendo of America and its parent company, Nintendo. Seeking US$105 million in damages and filed by antitrust lawyer Joseph Alioto, the suit alleged that Nintendo's use of technology to prevent unlicensed games from running on their Nintendo Entertainment System console violated United States antitrust laws. The lawsuit was settled three years later, under the terms of a secrecy order.

List of games

References

External links

 American Video Entertainment at MobyGames

Defunct video game companies of the United States
Video game companies based in California
Software companies based in the San Francisco Bay Area
Companies based in Burlingame, California
Defunct companies based in the San Francisco Bay Area